The 1996 Labatt Brier was held at the Riverside Coliseum in Kamloops, British Columbia. Prince Edward Island defeated Newfoundland in a tie-breaker to win the 4th seed in the playoffs. Jeff Stoughton of Manitoba defeated Kevin Martin of Alberta through extra ends, stealing one in the 11th end to win 8-7.

Teams

Round-robin standings

Round-robin results

Draw 1

Draw 2

Draw 3

Draw 4

Draw 5

Draw 6

Draw 7

Draw 8

Draw 9

Draw 10

Draw 11

Draw 12

Draw 13

Draw 14

Draw 15

Draw 16

Draw 17

Tiebreaker

Playoffs

3 vs. 4

1 vs. 2

Semifinal

Final

Statistics

Top 5 player percentages
Round Robin only

Team percentages
Round Robin only

References
CCA Archived statistics

The Brier
Sport in Kamloops
1996 in Canadian curling
Curling in British Columbia
1996 in British Columbia